The 2014 English cricket season was the 115th in which the County Championship had been an official competition. It began on 1 April with a round of university matches, continued until the conclusion of a round of County Championship matches on 23 September. Three major domestic competitions were contested: the 2014 County Championship, the 2014 Royal London One-Day Cup and the 2014 NatWest t20 Blast. The Royal London One-Day Cup and the NatWest t20 Blast were newly created competitions as from the 2014 season, replacing the Clydesdale Bank 40 and the Friends Life t20.

During this season, two Test teams toured England. Sri Lanka competed early in the summer, with India having also toured later in the year.

Roll of honour
Test series
 England v Sri Lanka: 2 Tests - Sri Lanka won 1–0.
 England v India: 5 Tests - England won 3–1.

ODI series
 England v Sri Lanka: 5 ODIs - Sri Lanka won 3–2.
 England v India: 5 ODIs - India won 3–1.

Twenty20 International series
 England v Sri Lanka: Only T20I - Sri Lanka won by 9 runs.
 England v India: Only T20I - England won by 3 runs.

County Championship
 Division One winners: Yorkshire
 Division One runners-up: Warwickshire
 Division Two winners: Hampshire
 Relegated from Division One: Lancashire and Northamptonshire
 Promoted from Division Two: Hampshire and Worcestershire

Royal London One-Day Cup
 Winners: Durham 
 Runners-up: Warwickshire Bears

Natwest t20 Blast
 Winners: Birmingham Bears
 Runners-up: Lancashire Lightning

Minor Counties Championship 
 Winners: Staffordshire
 Runners-up: Wiltshire

MCCA Knockout Trophy
 Winners: Devon
 Runners-up: Oxfordshire

Second XI Championship
 Winners: Leicestershire II

Second XI Trophy
 Winners: Leicestershire II

Second XI Twenty20
 Winners: Leicestershire II

Wisden Cricketers of the Year
 Shikhar Dhawan, Charlotte Edwards, Ryan Harris, Chris Rogers, Joe Root

PCA Player of the Year
 Adam Lyth

County Championship

Divisions

Division One Standings
 Pld = Played, W = Wins, L = Losses, D = Draws, T = Ties, A = Abandonments, Bat = Batting points, Bowl = Bowling points, Ded = Deducted points, Pts = Points.

Division Two Standings
 Pld = Played, W = Wins, L = Losses, D = Draws, T = Ties, A = Abandonments, Bat = Batting points, Bowl = Bowling points, Ded = Deducted points, Pts = Points.

Royal London One-Day Cup

Group stage

Group A

Group B

Knockout stage

NatWest t20 Blast

Group stage

North Division

South Division

Knockout stage

See also
Sri Lankan cricket team in England in 2014
Indian cricket team in England in 2014

References

 2014

Cricket season